Saint Luke's Hospital of Kansas City is a tertiary care hospital is located at 4401 Wornall Road in Kansas City, Missouri. It is part of the Saint Luke's Health System.

Hospital Background
St. Luke's Hospital was founded in 1882 at 10th & Campbell as a 50-bed institution and now is a 629-bed hospital. There are 466 skilled physicians representing more than 56 medical specialties. The hospital is located north of the Country Club Plaza and is currently under construction for expansion.

St. Luke's dates back to 1885, when it opened a 50-bed hospital at 1005 Campbell St. It has operated at its current location since 1902.

It is known for its Mid America Heart Institute, Mid America Brain and Stroke Institute, and neonatal intensive care services. It is a level 1 trauma center, which provides the most intensive level of trauma care.

Expansion
On October 9, 2011, St. Luke's unveiled their new $330 million Mid America Heart Institute.

References

External links

 Saint Luke's Hospital Official Website

Hospital buildings completed in 1885
Hospital buildings completed in 1902
Hospitals established in 1882
Buildings and structures in Kansas City, Missouri
Hospitals in Kansas City, Missouri